Peter Meyer (January 6, 1920 – March 7, 2002) was a German-born American astrophysicist notable for his research of cosmic rays.

The University of Chicago said that Meyer "conducted pioneering studies on cosmic rays".
The American Astronomical Society said that Meyer was "a distinguished astrophysicist and pioneer in cosmic-ray observations". 
Meyer was director of the Enrico Fermi Institute at the University of Chicago, was a chairman of the University of Chicago's physics department,
and a member of the National Academy of Sciences.
He was also chair of the Cosmic Ray Physics Division of the American Physical Society, a member of the Space Science Board of the National Academy of Sciences, and chair of the Committee on Astronomy and Astrophysics of the Space Science Board.

Life and career 
Meyer was born in Berlin, Germany. He received a doctorate from the University of Göttingen in 1948.
He immigrated to the United States in 1953 and joined the faculty of the University of Chicago. Meyer advanced to assistant professor in 1956, associate professor  in 1962 and professor in 1966. Meyer spent the rest of his career at the University of Chicago and became emeritus in 1990.
Meyer died in Chicago from complications of a stroke. His doctoral students include Rochus E. Vogt.

References

External links 

 Eugene N. Parker, "Peter Meyer", Biographical Memoirs of the National Academy of Sciences (2003)

1920 births
2002 deaths
American astrophysicists
University of Chicago faculty
University of Göttingen alumni
Members of the United States National Academy of Sciences
Scientists from Berlin
German emigrants to the United States